Liam Noble may refer to:

 Liam Noble (footballer) (born 1991), English professional footballer
 Liam Noble (musician) (born 1968), British jazz pianist, composer, arranger and educator